The papal conclave of 2005 was convened to elect a pope, the leader of the Catholic Church, to succeed Pope John Paul II following his death on 2 April 2005. In accordance with the apostolic constitution Universi Dominici gregis, which governed the vacancy of the Holy See, only cardinals who had not passed their 80th birthday on the day on which the Holy See became vacant (in this case, cardinals who were born on or after 2 April 1925) were eligible to participate in the conclave.  Although not a formal requirement, the cardinal electors invariably elected the pope from among their number. The election was carried out by secret ballot.

Of the 183 members of the College of Cardinals at the time of John Paul II's death, there were 117 cardinal electors who were eligible to participate in the subsequent conclave. Two cardinal electors did not participate, decreasing the number in attendance to 115.

Of the 115 attending cardinal electors, 5 were cardinal bishops, 93 were cardinal priests, and 17 were cardinal deacons; 2 had been created cardinals by Pope Paul VI and 113 by Pope John Paul II; 24 worked in the service of the Holy See (such as in the Roman Curia), 73 were in pastoral ministry outside Rome, and 18 had retired. Another 66 cardinals were ineligible to participate in the conclave, for reasons of age.

The cardinal electors entered the Sistine Chapel to begin the conclave on 18 April 2005. On 19 April, after four ballots over two days, they elected Cardinal Joseph Ratzinger, Prefect of the Congregation for the Doctrine of the Faith, who took the papal name Benedict XVI.

Cardinal electors 
The College of Cardinals is divided into three orders: cardinal bishops (CB), cardinal priests (CP) and cardinal deacons (CD), with precedence in that sequence. This is the order in which the cardinal electors process into the conclave, take the oath and cast their ballots. For cardinal bishops, except the Eastern Catholic patriarchs, the dean is first in precedence, followed by the vice-dean and then by the rest in order of appointment as cardinal bishops. For cardinal bishops who are Eastern Catholic patriarchs, for cardinal priests and for cardinal deacons, precedence is determined by the date of the consistory in which they were created cardinals and then by the order in which they appeared in the official announcement or bulletin.

Three of the cardinal electors were from the Eastern Catholic Churches: Ignace Moussa I Daoud (Syriac), Varkey Vithayathil (Syro-Malabar) and Lubomyr Husar (Ukrainian). The senior cardinal bishop, the senior cardinal priest, the senior cardinal deacon and the junior cardinal deacon, who were assigned specific roles in the conclave, such as presiding over the conclave itself (the senior cardinal bishop) or announcing the election of the pope (the senior cardinal deacon), were, respectively, Joseph Ratzinger, William Wakefield Baum, Jorge Arturo Medina Estévez and Attilio Nicora. The camerlengo of the Holy Roman Church, who was in charge of administering the Holy See during its vacancy, was Eduardo Martínez Somalo.

The data below are as of 2 April 2005, the date on which the Holy See became vacant. All cardinals are of the Latin Church unless otherwise stated. Cardinals belonging to institutes of consecrated life or to societies of apostolic life are indicated by the relevant post-nominal letters.

Not in attendance

Cardinal electors by continent and by country 
The 115 attending cardinal electors were from 52 countries on all six inhabited continents. The countries with the greatest number of cardinal electors were Italy (twenty), the United States (eleven) and, jointly, Germany and Spain (six each).

See also 
 Cardinals created by Paul VI
 Cardinals created by John Paul II
 Cardinal electors in the 1978 papal conclaves
 Cardinal electors in the 2013 papal conclave

Notes

References 

2005 papal conclave
2005
Pope John Paul II
Pope Benedict XVI